Kamikaze Girls, originally released in Japan as , is a 2002 Japanese light novel written by Novala Takemoto. The story centers on the friendship between two students named Momoko Ryugasaki and Ichigo "Ichiko" Shirayuri. Viz Media licensed the novel for an English-language release in North America in 2006.

A live-action film adaptation of the novel directed by Tetsuya Nakashima premiered in Japan in May 2004. It starred Kyoko Fukada as Momoko and Anna Tsuchiya as Ichigo. It was filmed in the town of Shimotsuma in Ibaraki Prefecture in eastern Japan. Viz Media screened the film in select theaters in the United States in late 2005 under the title Kamikaze Girls. They released it on DVD with hardcoded English subtitles in January 2006. The DVD extras include the original Japanese movie trailers, an interview with the lead actors, and a music video featuring Anna Tsuchiya. Third Window Films released Kamikaze Girls on Blu-ray in the United Kingdom in February 2010. The Blu-ray contains optional English subtitles, the same extras as the DVD, and the short film Birth of Unicorn Ryuji.

A manga series based on the novel was illustrated by Yukio Kanesada and serialized in Shogakukan's Betsucomi magazine in 2004. The chapters were later collected into a single  (bound volume) published under Shogakukan's Flower Comics imprint. Viz Media licensed the manga for an English-language release in North America in 2006.

Plot
The book begins with Momoko talking about her life as a lolita living in a small town in the Japanese countryside. She is the only lolita in her town and has no friends, but she doesn't care and believes that her lolita clothes are all she needs to make her happy. She is obsessed with getting clothes from Baby, The Stars Shine Bright, her favorite clothing boutique. When she runs out of money, she decides to sell some of her father's old bootleg clothes. When Ichigo, a member of an all-girl biker gang finds out about the bootleg apparel, she decides to take a look and is easily impressed with them. She soon shows up at Momoko's house almost daily to buy things for the members of her gang. They become closer friends and embark on a journey to Baby, The Stars Shine Bright, where Momoko meets the brand's designer. Because of her skill with embroidery, Momoko is recruited to embroider a dress. At a pachinko parlour, Ichigo meets a gangster with a pompadour and falls in love. However, she soon discovers that he is the fiancée of her gang leader.

Heartbroken by the loss of her first love and inspired by Momoko's independence, Ichigo plans to leave her gang. To do this, she accepts their "challenge," which involves a ritualistic beating. Momoko finds out about the challenge and goes to Ichigo's aid. After scaring the gang by pretending to be the daughter of a famous gangster, Momoko is considered the winner, and the two girls ride off laughing.

When it comes time for Momoko to show the designer her embroidery, she arrives on time and everyone loves her work. Ultimately, she decides she is happier wearing the clothing than making it. As for Ichigo, she is offered to work as a model for Baby, The Stars Shine Bright after she impresses a cameraman. On her first day of work, she leaves bruises on five of the crew members but nonetheless becomes sought after by other brands. The movie ends with an image of Momoko and Ichigo riding along the road and laughing.

Media

Novel

Live-action film

Cast

 Kyoko Fukada as Momoko Ryugasaki
 Anna Tsuchiya as Ichigo "Ichiko" Shirayuri
 Hiroyuki Miyasako as Dame Oyaji, Momoko's father
 Ryoko Shinohara as Saionji Midori, Momoko's mother
 Kirin Kiki as Momoko's grandmother

 Sadawo Abe as "Unicorn" Ryuji
 Yoshinori Okada as Akinori Isobe
 Eiko Koike as Akimi, a gang member
 Shin Yazawa as Miko, a gang member
 Yoshiyoshi Arakawa as the grocery store manager
 Katsuhisa Namase as the pachinko parlor manager
 Hirotaro Honda as a yakuza boss

Staff
 Director – Tetsuya Nakashima  
 Director of Photography – Shoichi Ato
 Production Designer – Towako Kuwashima
 Animation – Yojiro Nishimura (Studio 4°C)
 Music – Yoko Kanno

Manga
The manga adaptation of Kamikaze Girls was illustrated by Yukio Kanesada and serialized in Shogakukan's Betsucomi magazine in 2004. Shogakukan collected the chapters into a single  (bound volume) and published it in June 2004. The manga's storyline is a condensed version of the original novel and only takes up about half of the volume; the latter half contains a bonus story in which Ichigo falls in love with the twin brother of the boy she loved in the novel. Viz Media licensed the manga for an English-language release in North America. A preview first appeared in the November 2005 issue of their Shojo Beat magazine. Viz published the full volume on February 7, 2006.

Reception

Critical response
Kamikaze Girls was awarded Best Film, Best Director, Best Actress, and two other awards at the 26th Yokohama Film Festival. It also won Best Film and Best Director at the 14th Japan Film Professional Awards. For her performance in the film, Anna Tsuchiya was named Best New Actress at the Awards of the Japanese Academy, the Blue Ribbon Awards, and the Hochi Film Awards.

Review aggregation website Rotten Tomatoes gives Kamikaze Girls an approval rating of 62%, based on 29 reviews, with an average rating of 6.1/10. The film also has a 56/100 average ("mixed or average reviews") on the review aggregator Metacritic.

Box office
Released on May 29, 2004, Kamikaze Girls debuted at No. 4 on its opening weekend (behind Crimson Rivers II, Troy, and Crying Out Love in the Center of the World).

References

External links
 Kamikaze Girls at Viz Media
 
 
 
  

2000s fantasy comedy films
2002 Japanese novels
2004 comedy films
2004 films
2004 manga
Anime and manga based on light novels
Comedy-drama anime and manga
Films directed by Tetsuya Nakashima
Japanese comedy-drama films
Japanese teen films
Light novels
Lolita fashion
New People films
Shogakukan manga
Shōjo manga
Viz Media manga
Viz Media novels
Yankī anime and manga
2000s Japanese films